The 125th Anniversary of the Confederation of Canada Medal is a commemorative medal struck by the Royal Canadian Mint to commemorate the 125th anniversary of the Confederation of Canada and was awarded to Canadians who were deemed to have made a significant contribution to their fellow citizens, to their community, or to Canada. Nominations were submitted to lieutenant governors and territorial commissioners, senators, members of parliament, provincial governments, the Public Service Commission of Canada, the Canadian Forces, the Royal Canadian Mounted Police, and various federal government departments, as well as organizations throughout the country, and some 42,000 medals were awarded.

The medal's design was approved by the monarch, Elizabeth II. It is in the form of a  diameter, rhodium plated copper and zinc alloy disc with, on the obverse, the image of the Royal Cypher surmounted by a St. Edward's Crown (symbolising the sovereign as fount of honour) all superimposed on a large single maple leaf and circumscribed with the words CONFEDERATION • CONFÉDÉRATION above and the years 1867 — 1992 below. The medal's reverse shows the shield of the Royal Arms of Canada encircled by the motto ribbon of the Order of Canada and ensigned by the crest of the Canadian arms (a crowned lion holding a maple leaf in the right front paw), all above the country's national motto, A MARI USQUE AD MARE. This medallion is worn at the left chest, suspended on a 31.8mm wide ribbon with blue edging and white between with five vertical red stripes arranged equally, each of those representing 25 year intervals, thus totalling 125 years.

See also
 Canadian order of precedence (decorations and medals)
 Canadian Centennial Medal

References

Further reading

External links
 Veterans Affairs Canada site 
 Canadian Forces Administrative Order 18-4 Recommendations for Canadian Orders, Decorations and Military Honours

Civil awards and decorations of Canada
Canadian historical anniversaries